The plum curculio (Conotrachelus nenuphar) is a true weevil native to the regions east of the Rocky Mountains in the United States and Canada. It is notorious for destroying fruits if left uncontrolled.

Life stages 
A female curculio uses a number of hosts to lay her eggs in, including plums, peaches, apples, pears, and other pome and stone fruits. After the female has chosen a suitable host, she will build an egg chamber under the fruit skin to receive the egg. She then turns around and places the egg in the cavity. Next, she slices a curved slit underneath the egg cavity, leaving the egg in a flap of flesh and causing a crescent-shaped scar on the outside of the fruit.  Without this curved slit, eggs are killed by pressure from the growth of the host fruit.

Appearance 
Plum curculio larvae are typically 6 to 9 mm long when fully grown, when they reach the pupal stage measuring about 5 to 7 mm; all adult characteristics are visible in this stage prior to transformation. Adult plum curculio are about 4 to 6 mm long and have a small, rough snout colored with black, gray, and brown specks. Four pairs of ridges cover the wings; however, because of the middle humps they appear to have only two ridges.

Hosts 
The plum curculio can be found in apple, nectarine, plum, cherry, peach, apricot, pear and quince. It may also survive on wild plum, hawthorn, and crabapple. It is found most commonly in areas east of the Rocky Mountains and in eastern Canada. The beetles are most active during the spring time when the weather is warm, damp, and cloudy. They are often seen in heavy leafed trees.

Injury or damage to fruit 
Plum curculio beetles can cause irreparable damage to a fruit harvest. In badly damaged fruit, one can identify large scars and bumps due to feeding. Most internally damaged fruit (through burrowing into the fruit) drops prematurely.

Control 
Control of the plum curculio is fairly easy to maintain. Application of proper insecticide during the pink and petal-fall stages of apples, also the petal-fall and shuck-split stages in peaches and cherries is usually enough to reduce plum curculio damage to a minimum. An important preventative measure is destroying the fallen, damaged host fruits before the adults emerge. Pest management at petal fall is also of particular importance.

References

External links 

  Pest Management Laboratory MSU - plum curculio
  Ohio State University Extension fact sheet - plum curculio and its control
  Michigan State University Extension fact sheet - plum curculio
  University of Kentucky Entomology - plum curculio
 Bugguide.net. Species Conotrachelus nenuphar - Plum Curculio

Molytinae
Beetles of North America
Agricultural pest insects
Beetles described in 1797